Campling is a surname. Notable people with the surname include:

 Christopher Campling (1925–2020), Anglican priest
 Frederick Campling (1908–1945), English cricketer and airman
 Roy Campling (1892–1977), Australian cricketer

See also
 Camplin

English-language surnames